Juniata may refer to:

Places in the United States

In Michigan 
Juniata Station, Michigan or Juniata, a railway station in Fremont Township, Tuscola County
Juniata Township, Michigan, a civil township of Tuscola County

In Nebraska 
Juniata Township, Adams County, Nebraska
Juniata, Nebraska, a village in Juniata Township

In Pennsylvania 
Juniata, Philadelphia, a neighborhood in Philadelphia
Juniata College, a private, liberal arts college in Huntingdon
Juniata County, Pennsylvania
Juniata River, a tributary of the Susquehanna River and source for most of the other names
Juniata Terrace, Pennsylvania, a borough in Mifflin County
Juniata Township, Bedford County, Pennsylvania
Juniata Township, Blair County, Pennsylvania
Juniata Township, Huntingdon County, Pennsylvania
Juniata Township, Perry County, Pennsylvania

Ships
, the name of various United States Navy ships
 SS Juniata, former name of the Milwaukee Clipper, a Great Lakes steamer

Other
 Onojutta-Haga, or Juniata (Iottecas), a former Native American tribe of Pennsylvania
 Juniata (train), a New York-Pittsburgh passenger train operated by Pennsylvania Railroad and Penn Central
 Juniata Formation, a bedrock formation in Pennsylvania
 Juniata Terminal Company, locomotive leasing and railcar-storage company
 Juniata Valley Railroad, a short line railroad in Pennsylvania
 Juniata and Southern Railway, a former rail line in Pennsylvania